Bailey Mes (born 27 May 1989) is an Auckland born New Zealand netball player. She can play at goal shoot, goal attack, and wing attack. She has played for the Mainland Tactix in the ANZ Championships since 2015.

In 2012, she was selected into the Silver Ferns and made her debut in the Quad Series that year, against South Africa. She was a shock selection after playing only one quarter in the 2012 ANZ season, and was picked based on a strong trial, and her natural athleticism and fitness. She played in the 2012 Constellation Cup and Quad Series, earning three caps.

She was also selected for the 2012 Fast5 Netball World Series, where she was used in the goal shoot position. She performed well in a number of matches and finished with one of the highest shooting percentages in the tournament.

References

External links 
https://web.archive.org/web/20151103021937/http://www.tactix.org.nz/2016-team/players/bailey-mes
https://www.mynetball.co.nz/silver-ferns/team/squad/bailey-mes.html
https://web.archive.org/web/20130207080311/http://northernmystics.co.nz/Bailey-Mes/0,2715,11532,00.html

1989 births
Living people
New Zealand netball players
Northern Mystics players
ANZ Championship players
New Zealand international netball players
People educated at Onehunga High School
Netball players at the 2018 Commonwealth Games
2019 Netball World Cup players
Commonwealth Games competitors for New Zealand
Netball players from Auckland
2015 Netball World Cup players
Waikato Bay of Plenty Magic players
Mainland Tactix players
New Zealand international Fast5 players
Commonwealth Games medallists in netball
Commonwealth Games bronze medallists for New Zealand
Netball players at the 2022 Commonwealth Games
Medallists at the 2022 Commonwealth Games